Russia Today may refer to:

 RT (TV network), a global news channel from Russia (which was known as Russia Today before its rebranding in 2009)
 Rossiya Segodnya, an international news agency from Russia (the name translates to Russia Today)
 Russian Federation Today, a semi-monthly magazine from Russia